Monika Kropshofer (born 14 November 1952 in Neuwied) is a German painter and photographer. Since the middle of the year 2000 Kropshofer has gained renown through her large-format painted landscape and architecture photographs which were created as a result of her many work journeys and stays in Europe, Africa und Asia.

Life and work
From 1972 to 1977, Monika Kropshofer studied first Law at the Johannes Gutenberg-University in Mainz. After her two years as an articled clerk in Mainz, she worked as a lawyer from 1980, first in Mainz, then in Koblenz, and took her doctorate in 1982. In 1983, Kropshofer opened her own law office and was active as a court lawyer at the Coblence High Court of Justice. She terminated this activity in 1990 to study the History of art at the Rheinische Friedrich-Wilhelms-Universität Bonn. At the same time, she worked as a freelance artist, finishing her studies in 1995.

Kropshofer began her autodidactic artistic training by  experimenting with various picture material and bases. From the beginning, she turned her main attention to the combination of various media, especially photography and painting. Kropshofer projects landscape and architecture photographs onto the most varied kinds of bases (glass, sheets of plastic, photographic paper, window blinds, plastic foils) and subsequently works on them with paint. Here, Kropshofer does without any additional digital picture processing. The photographs are taken during the artist's regular working trips and stays in Europe, Africa and South-East Asia. Since the mid-2000s, the works have become larger in format and more far-reaching and from now on, extensive installations and objects were also created.

Kropshofer's artistic discussion always turns around the formal dialogue between the object depicted and the media used. Her method for doing this is the construction and deconstruction of spatiality, depending on each picture basis and the revelation of the appropriateness of the structures in landscape and architecture with the help of painting. Thus her works are in the tradition of photography's very own  discourse, the question of reproduction and reality, fiction and real life.

The artist lives and works in Boppard.

Works in public collections 
 Ludwig Museum Koblenz: Untitled (Island), 2010, 70 x 100 cm, mixed technique on digital print on plastic plate
 City of Grimmen: Untitled (Grimmen), 2007, 2 works, each 30 x 45 cm, mixed technique on photo paper
 Goethe-Institut Taiwan: Untitled (Vietnam), 2007, 50 x 75 cm, mixed technique on photo paper
 Museum am Strom, Bingen am Rhein: Untitled, Wernerkapelle I, 2011, 105 × 70 cm, mixed technique on digital print on plastic plate
 City of Boppard: Boppard, Electoral Castle, 2015, 100 x 150 cm, mixed technique on digital print on plastic plate
 Regional Authority Rheinland, Langenfeld: Untitled (Memorial stone, cemetery Hadamar), 2016, 80 × 120 cm, mixed technique on digital print on plastic plate
 Villa Vigoni, Menaggio: Untitled (Weimar, Roman house), 2017, 80 × 120 cm, mixed technique on digital print on plastic plate
 Stadt Lahr: metamorphoses, 4 works, 2018, each 165 × 110 cm, mixed technique on digital print on multilayer plastic plates

Exhibitions (selection) 
 May–June 2007: Rot(T)räume, Showroom Condehouse, Cologne, Germany
 July–September 2007: Strukturen: Wasser und Backstein („Structures: Water and Brick“), Museum and Water Tower, Grimmen, Germany
 May–June 2008: Transformationen (Transformations), Municipal Gallery Baumhaus, Wismar, Germany
 October–November 2008: Wasser und Stein („Water and Stone“), German Arts Centre, Taipei, Taiwan
 June–July 2009: Structure and Ornament, Hotel Intercontinental Hong Kong (promoted by the German Consulate-General), Hongkong
 February 2010: Hybrid, Espace Paragon, Luxembourg
 April–May 2010: ArchiTextur, Middle Rhine Museum, Coblence, Germany
 March–May 2011: Interventionen, State Representation of the Rhineland-Palatinate, Berlin, Germany
 January–February 2012: La dialectique de la réflexion, House of the Rhineland-Palatinate, Dijon, France
 July–October 2012: Changing Dream-Streams (I), Museum am Strom, Bingen am Rhein, Germany, together with Elisabeth Bergner
 October–November 2012: Journey of Discovery, Gallery Baum, Seoul, South Korea
 February–March 2013: Raumwelten („Space Worlds“), Landtag of Rhineland-Palatinate, Mainz, Germany together with Susan Geel
 April–June 2013: Changing Dream-Streams (II), Museumkrems, Krems, Germany, together with Elisabeth Bergner
 November 2013: Duett, Gallery Alfred Treiber, Vienna, Austria, together with Elisabeth Bergner
 May–July 2014: New Works, Gallery photo-city, Rangoon, Myanmar
 February 2015: The world itself, Kunsthalle Herrenhof, Neustadt-Mußbach, Germany
 October–December 2015: Back to basics, Museum Boppard, Boppard, Germany
 October 2015–January 2016: Der Rhein - eine romantische Affäre, StadtGalerie Neuwied, Neuwied, Germany
 April–May 2016: Private View, Gallery Art nou mil-lenni, Barcelona, Spain
 April–May 2016: Translucide, Gallery Retrouvailles, Stadtbredimus, Luxembourg
 August 2016: KUNSTPOSTSTELLE, Exhibition at the GEDOK-Gallery, Berlin, Germany
 March–May 2017: STADT, LAND, FLUSS, Deutsche Gesellschaft für Internationale Zusammenarbeit, Bonn, Germany
 May–November 2017: Borderline, Villa Vigoni, Menaggio, Italy
 September–October 2017: Places and Spaces, Wissenschaftszentrum Bonn, Bonn, Germany
 December 2017–January 2018: Hommage to Elsa Brändström, Frauenmuseum, Bonn, Germany
 March 2018: Der Engel von Sibirien. Elsa Brändström, Tapetenwerk, Leipzig, Germany
 March–April 2018: Elsa Brändström, Abbey, Grimmen, Germany
 April–October 2018: Metamorphosen, art project at Landesgartenschau Baden -Württemberg, Lahr, Germany
 September–November 2018: Entdeckungsreise, Galery VIA, Baden-Baden
 October–November 2018: Zwischen Himmel und Erde, Haus an der Redoute, Bonn - Bad Godesberg
 October–November 2018: Ein Jahrhundert Frauenwahlrecht, Kunstforum GEDOK, Hamburg
 January–February 2019: Wahrheit und Fiktion, Galery of the Kunstverein L´Art pour Lahr, Lahr
 June–July 2019: Heimat 2.0, Ministry of Homeland, Municipal Affairs, Construction and Equality of the State of North Rhine-Westphalia, Düsseldorf
 September 2019 –January 2020: Bauhaus – form und reform, Landesmuseum Mainz, Mainz
 January–March 2020: Art Salon, Museum Gustavo de Maetzu, Estella-Lizarra, Spain
 July–October 2020: Paradiese, Stadtgalerie Neuwied, Neuwied, Germany
 September–October 2020: Leidenschaft Kunst, GEDOK-Galerie, Hamburg, Germany
 October–November 2020: Feuer und Flamme, Kunstforum Eifel, Gemünd, Germany
 June–July 2021: Dialogue among the Antithesis, Museum Crocetti, Rome, Italy
 June–July 2021: Verborgenes, Haus an der Redoute, Bonn, Germany
 September 2021: Contesti, Galerie Arte Borgo, Rome, Italy
 September–October 2021: Schattenseite, Urban Gallery Schwingeler Hof, Wesseling, Germany

Literature 
 Beyer, Savoy, Tegethoff: Allgemeines Künstlerlexikon, Volume 82, Berlin 2014.
 Changing Dream Streams, catalogue  of the exhibition of the same title by the two artists Monika Kropshofer and Elisabeth Bergner, Boppard, 2012, .
 Interventionen: catalogue  of the exhibition of the same title at the State Representation of the Rhineland-Palatinate, Berlin, 2011,  .
 Back to basics: catalogue  of the exhibition of the same title at the Museum Boppard, Boppard, 2015,  .
 Architekturfotografie als Ausstellungsarchitektur, in:  GDKE Rheinland-Pfalz, Landesmuseum Mainz (Ed.): bauhaus - form und reform, E.A. Seemann-Verlag, Mainz und Leipzig 2019, .
 Dialogo tra le antitesi, catalogue of the exhibition of Museum Crocetti, Rome, Italy, 2021.

External links 
 The artist's official website
 Monika Kropshofer in the General Lexicon of Artists
 Video on the opening of the exhibition Journey of Discovery in Seoul, 2012, access on January 20th 2015
 Artist's profile on the website of the Gallery nou mil-lenni, Barcelona, access on May 18th 2016

Single References 

Photographers from Rhineland-Palatinate
Artists from Rhineland-Palatinate
German women artists
German women photographers
1952 births
Living people
People from Neuwied